Florence K. Murray (1916–2004) was a high-ranking officer in the Women's Army Corps, the first female state senator in Rhode Island, the first female judge in Rhode Island and the first female member of the Rhode Island Supreme Court.

Early life
Florence Kerins Murray was born in Newport, Rhode Island in 1916. She was of Irish American ancestry and was a member of the Roman Catholic Church. She was a graduate of Rogers High School in Newport, and Syracuse University in New York. She graduated from Boston University law school in 1942. She was married to Paul F. Murray, who died in 1995.

World War II service
Murray was commissioned as an officer in the Women's Army Corps during the Second World War and rose to the rank of lieutenant colonel, the youngest woman to achieve that rank at that time. She served on the staff of the Director of the Women's Army Corps, Colonel Oveta Hobby, in Washington, D.C.

She was discharged from the Army in 1947. For her military service she was awarded the Legion of Merit, the Army Commendation Medal, the Women's Army Corps Service Medal, the American Campaign Medal and the World War Two Victory Medal.

Political career
After the war, she was elected as a Democrat to the Rhode Island state senate and served from 1949 to 1956. She was the first woman to serve as a state senator in Rhode Island. She was a delegate to the Democratic National Convention in 1952.

Judicial career
In 1956, she was the first woman appointed as a Superior Court judge in Rhode Island. In 1978, she was appointed Chief Justice of the Rhode Island Superior Court.

In November 1979, she was elected by the Rhode Island General Assembly as an associate justice of the Rhode Island Supreme Court. She was the first female supreme court justice in Rhode Island. She retired from the court in 1996 after having served as a judge for 40 years.

Honors 
Murray received the Silver Shingle Award from Boston University School of Law.

She was inducted into the Rhode Island Heritage Hall of Fame in 1980.

Death and burial
She died at her home in Newport on March 28, 2004, and is buried with her husband in Trinity Cemetery in Portsmouth, Rhode Island.

Legacy
The Florence K. Murray award of the National Association of Women Judges is named after her. The award is presented to a non-judge who has influenced women to pursue legal careers, opened doors for women attorneys, or advanced opportunities for women within the legal profession.

The Rhode Island Bar Association established a Florence K. Murray Award in her honor.

The Newport County Courthouse was renamed the Florence K. Murray Judicial Complex in 1990, the first time a courthouse in the United States was named in honor of a female jurist. There is a full length, life-sized portrait of Justice Murray in the courthouse.

See also
List of female state supreme court justices
List of first women lawyers and judges in Rhode Island

References

External links 

 Photo of Major Florence Murray (Truman Library)
 Portrait of Judge Florence Murray by Maxwell Mays

1916 births
2004 deaths
Syracuse University alumni
Boston University School of Law alumni
Politicians from Newport, Rhode Island
Recipients of the Legion of Merit
Burials in Rhode Island
20th-century American judges
Justices of the Rhode Island Supreme Court
Superior court judges in the United States
Democratic Party Rhode Island state senators
20th-century American women judges
20th-century American politicians
21st-century American women